Callitris roei, or Roe's cypress-pine, is a species of Callitris native to Australia, where it is endemic to southwestern Western Australia from Moora south to Albany and east to Cape Arid National Park.

It is an evergreen shrub or small tree growing to 5 m tall. The leaves are borne in decussate whorls of three, scale-like, 2–5 mm long and 1–1.5 mm broad; leaves on seedlings are longer and needle-like, not scale-like. The seed cones are globose, 1–2 cm diameter, with six scales in two whorls of three; they mature in about 18 months from pollination. The pollen cones are cylindrical, 3–6 mm long and 1.2–2 mm broad.

References

roei
Flora of Western Australia
Pinales of Australia
Vulnerable flora of Australia
Taxonomy articles created by Polbot
Taxa named by Stephan Endlicher
Endemic flora of Southwest Australia